Bespoke is an adjective for anything commissioned to a particular specification.

Specific uses include:
Bespoke medicine, a movement to better fit treatment to the individual patient
Bespoke portfolio (CDO), a portfolio designed to meet the requirements of a specific investor
Bespoke CDO, a bespoke, synthetic CDO 
Bespoke shoes
Bespoke software, software written to the specific requirement of a customer
Bespoke tailoring, men's clothing made to the individual measurements of the customer

Arts, entertainment, and media 
 Bespoke (album), an album by Daedelus released in April 2011 
 The Bespoke Overcoat (1956), British short film based on a 1953 play of the same name

Companies
Bespoke Arcades, a British manufacturer of custom-built arcade machines
Bespoke Collection, a wine producer and lifestyle brand based in Yountville, California
Bespoked, promoter of custom-made bicycles from Bristol, UK